Laurie Show was a 16-year-old sophomore at Conestoga Valley High School who was stalked by her classmates and murdered on December 20, 1991, in the United States. Her body was discovered in her Lancaster, Pennsylvania, home by her mother Hazel Show with her throat having been slit. Her classmates Lisa Michelle Lambert, Tabitha Buck, and Lawrence "Butch" Yunkin were all subsequently charged with her murder.

Stalking and murder
Lambert initially began harassing Show in 1991, after learning that Show had briefly dated Yunkin over the summer. Lambert and Yunkin had a previous relationship, but had reportedly not been dating during the time Yunkin was dating Show. Show and Yunkin had gone on a few dates, with Show reporting to her mother that Yunkin had date raped her. Shortly after his final date with Show, Yunkin resumed dating Lambert, who was pregnant with his child. Reported to be "obsessively jealous" of Show, Lambert proceeded to harass Show in various ways, such as appearing at Show's job and verbally assaulting her. Witnesses reported that Lambert had expressed an intent to "scare Laurie, then hurt her, then slit her throat".

On December 20, 1991, Laurie Show was discovered, fatally wounded, in her home by her mother. Police later recorded that Show had received "a five-inch gash to the throat; a stab wound that punctured a lung and another that grazed her spine; several wounds to the head; and a number of defensive wounds". An autopsy showed that Show's left common carotid artery had been severed.  Hazel Show was not at home at the time of the attack, having been duped by the killers into going to the high school to speak to a guidance counselor. Show's mother reported to the police that her daughter had named Lambert as her killer, saying, "Michelle did it". Shortly after, Show bled to death. 

Police arrested Lambert, Yunkin, and Lambert's friend, Tabitha Buck, at a local bowling alley later that day for the murder of Show. While in police custody, the detectives and police take notes and photographs of all three suspects. The police and detectives notice that Lisa Michelle Lambert has not one defensive wound on her, while Tabitha Buck had many, including fresh scratch marks on her face and scratch marks in her right shoulder. Lawrence Yunkin also had a few defensive wounds. For such a violent crime against Laurie Show, all three suspects should've had defensive wounds but Lisa Lambert had none.  Initial statements from the three claimed that Yunkin had dropped Lambert and Buck off at Show's house, where the two girls murdered Show. Yunkin stated that he had not participated in the murder, and that, while he was aware that Lambert and Buck planned to cut Show's hair with the knife as a prank, he did provide them with an alibi, as well as helping to dispose of evidence. Lambert and Buck would later recant their initial statements, with Lambert claiming that an abusive Yunkin had encouraged her to harass and assault Show.
A few weeks after the crime, an earring back was found in the room of Laurie Show , which was found to belong to Lawrence Yunkin. This evidence was turned over the police and was eventually somehow lost in evidence.

1992 trials
Lambert, Buck, and Yunkin were each tried for the murder of Laurie Show. Yunkin agreed to testify against Lambert, stating that she and Buck had slit Show's throat after the two had punctured one of Show's lungs. A pair of sweatpants Lambert had worn during the crime were entered into evidence by the prosecution, as Show's blood was present on them. Another exhibit was a letter from Lambert to Yunkin, in which Lambert states, "I know I'm not an angel, but Lawrence, I never got mad enough to kill."

Verdicts
Lambert was convicted on July 20, 1992 of first-degree murder and criminal conspiracy in the death of Show. Buck was convicted of similar charges, and both young women were sentenced to life in prison without the possibility of parole.

Lambert was initially incarcerated at Cambridge Springs State Correctional Institution, while Buck was sent to Muncy State Correctional Institution. Yunkin received a lesser sentence for his testimony and was granted parole in 2003.

1997 re-trial
Lambert appealed the 1992 conviction, and in 1997, appeared in court for a federal habeas corpus hearing. U.S. District Judge Stewart Dalzell presided over the trial. Lambert's lawyers claimed there were several inconsistencies with the evidence and testimony given in the earlier trial, and that Lambert was innocent. Lambert claimed she had been framed by Lancaster police officers in order to keep her from coming forward with charges that they had gang-raped her.

A huge amount of Evidence provided at the hearing included the sweatpants entered into the 1992 proceeding as well as correspondence between Yunkin and Lambert where Yunkin admits in his own handwriting that he and Tabitha Buck killed Laurie Show and asked Lambert to take blame for him, because she'll get less time because she is a female. While understand the police and prosecutors consistently contradicted themselves and their story. While on the stand a police officer stated that he never found a pink trash bag which would prove with evidence of Lawrence Yunkin proving he was involved in the crime. A video tape was shown of this officer on the stand finding the pink trash bag with the evidence. Another key point in that the murder victim's mother Hazel show told the judge that she had in fact seen Lawrence yunkin at the crime scene on the morning of the murder and had in fact told police this and the police told Miss hazel show not to worry about it.  Dalzell overturned the murder conviction on April 15, 1997, citing that "prosecutorial misconduct" had resulted in an incorrect ruling. Dalzell also barred the state of Pennsylvania from re-trying Lambert. Dalzell's ruling was later overturned in January 1998 by a federal appeals panel that stated that Lambert had "not yet exhausted her appeals in state court" and Lambert was taken back to prison.

1998 appeal
After Dalzell's ruling was overturned, the federal court system debated whether to keep Lambert in jail or to uphold Dalzell's verdict. Lambert filed an appeal for a hearing over the second overturning of the verdict, but was denied. In February 1998, the Pennsylvania Supreme Court returned the case to the Lancaster County Court system, stating that Lambert "must first take up her claims [there]". The third trial took place in May 1998, with a federal appeals court temporarily freeing Lambert under the belief that she would win her case. Judge Lawrence F. Stengel oversaw the trial, he is also Lambert's trial judge from her first trial in 1992. Judge Stewart Stengel did not allow all the evidence from the 1997 hearing in judge dalzell court room to come in during this hearing. Various witnesses were called to testify against Lambert, including the detective that had overseen the 1991 murder case as well as Lambert's accomplices, Buck and Yunkin. The detective’s testimony denied allegations that evidence had been tampered with.

Lambert now testified that Yunkin had participated in the murders, choking Show. She also stated that she had attempted to help defend Show against the other two assailants, and that she had tried to pull the victim out of the apartment. Evidence from the 1997 re-trial was presented again. The defense argued that Lambert had not participated in the act, that she had been sent out of the room by Yunkin, and that Lambert had unquestioningly obeyed Yunkin’s orders due to battered woman syndrome. A previous boyfriend of Lambert's confirmed that he had witnessed Yunkin "yank [Lambert] into a room", at which point Yunkin began yelling at her. He also testified that he had seen a police officer, who matched one of the descriptions Lambert gave of her alleged rapists, give her a "threatening glare" at a local festival.

Lambert's lawyers presented correspondence between Lambert and Yunkin that they claimed proved that Lambert had not been involved in the murder and that Yunkin had asked her to lie for him. They also questioned whether or not Show would have been able to speak to her mother before her death, as her throat had been cut, and alleged that Show had actually written out the initials of her murderers, Buck and Yunkin.

Buck denied these claims, testifying that Lambert had actively participated in the murder, and that she had instructed Buck to "wear her hair up and not to wear make-up or fingernail polish". Yunkin was later brought to the stand, and the sweatpants that had been alleged to be his in the 1997 trial were produced. Yunkin was ordered to hold the sweatpants up against his body, which were shown to be too short for him, as well as being made of a different fabric from the garment entered into evidence in the 1992 trial. A relative of Yunkin  provided a poem written by Lambert in jail that described the murder. Crime scene experts also testified that no evidence of Show writing any initials in her blood was found, and that other evidence discovered at the crime scene did not corroborate Lambert's story.

In August 1998, Judge Stengel announced his verdict, stating he would uphold the original guilty verdict against Lambert, and that "even if he believed [her] story ... [she] would still be guilty of first-degree murder as an accomplice". Federal Judge Anita Brody later upheld this verdict. Lambert attempted to appeal the 1998 decision in 2003 and to bring the case to the Supreme Court of the United States, but was rejected both times. She exhausted her appeals in 2005.

Aftermath

Anti-stalking activism
After her daughter's death in 1991, Hazel Show started campaigning for stronger anti-stalking laws in Pennsylvania. Show's murder helped push forward anti-stalking legislation, with new laws signed into effect in June 1993.

1996 rape charges
In 2007 Lambert appeared in court to sue the correctional institution over claims that she was raped and assaulted by state prison staff in 1996. Lambert's lawyer argued that the institution had done nothing to stop the assaults and that Lambert's conviction would impede her from having a fair trial. Lambert received a $35,000 settlement, with the guard accused of assaulting her serving a - to 3-year sentence.

Resentencing
On November 22, 2017, Buck was resentenced to a term of 28 years to life due to a Supreme Court ruling banning mandatory life sentences for juveniles. Buck was granted parole on December 21, 2019.

Media
An hour-long special episode of 20/20 was aired in February 1999, featuring interviews with several former classmates who said that Lambert had made death threats against Show, as well as presenting evidence that one of the officers who allegedly raped Lambert was on a honeymoon during the time the alleged rape occurred. The murder was also featured on a season 8 episode of American Justice, titled "A Teenage Murder Mystery".

In 2000, the murder was adapted into a TV film entitled The Stalking of Laurie Show (also known by the title Rivals outside of the US). The film was directed by Norma Bailey and starred Jennifer Finnigan as Laurie Show. Critical assessment of the film was poor, with one journalist commenting that the film's depiction of both Laurie Show and Lambert distorted the true story. 

In 2001, writer and journalist Lyn Riddle wrote Overkill, a true-crime book about Show's murder and the resulting trials of Lambert and her accomplices.

References

1991 in Pennsylvania
1991 murders in the United States
1990s crimes in Pennsylvania
1990s trials
Deaths by person in Pennsylvania
Deaths by stabbing in Pennsylvania
December 1991 crimes
December 1991 events in the United States
Murder trials
Trials in the United States